Setepenre or Sotepenre ( "chosen of Re") was an ancient Egyptian princess of the 18th Dynasty; sixth and last daughter of Pharaoh Akhenaten and his chief queen Nefertiti.

Family
Setepenre was born around the 9th to 11th year of her father Akhenaten in the city of Akhetaten.  She had five older sisters named Meritaten, Meketaten, Ankhesenpaaten, Neferneferuaten Tasherit, and Neferneferure.

Life
One of the earliest depictions of Setepenre is in a fresco from the King’s House in Amarna. She is depicted sitting on her mother Nefertiti's lap. The fresco is much damaged and only a small hand of Setepenre remains. The fresco is dated to ca. year 9 of Akhenaten, and the entire family is depicted.

The next time the six princesses appeared together was in Year 12, on the eighth day of the second month of winter, during the so-called “reception of foreign tributes”. This event was depicted in the Amarna tombs of Meryre II and Huya. In the tomb of Meryre II, Akhenaten and Nefertiti are shown seated in a kiosk, receiving tribute from foreign lands. The daughters of the royal couple are shown standing behind their parents. Setepenre is the last daughter in the lower register. She is standing right behind her sister Neferneferure, who is holding a gazelle. Setepenre is shown reaching over to pet the gazelle.

Death and burial
On Wall C in Room  of the Royal Tomb of Akhenaten the names of five princesses are listed, that of Neferneferure is plastered over and only four of the princesses are depicted. This probably means that Setepenre predeceased Neferneferure, and it is likely that Setepenre died around Year 13 or 14, before she reached her sixth birthday. Since she is not shown on Wall B in Room , where the royal family mourns the death of the second princess Meketaten, it is likely that she predeceased Meketaten as well, perhaps before the construction of the royal tomb was advanced enough to allow burial. She was possibly the first of the princesses to die. It is possible that her body was later moved to Room  of the Royal Tomb.

References

Princesses of the Eighteenth Dynasty of Egypt
14th-century BC Egyptian women
Children of Akhenaten
Nefertiti
Royalty who died as children